

NVC community W8 (Fraxinus excelsior - Acer campestre - Mercurialis perennis woodland) is one of the woodland communities in the British National Vegetation Classification system. It is one of the six communities falling in the "mixed deciduous and oak/birch woodlands" group.

This is a widely distributed community. There are seven subcommunities.

Community composition

Six constant species are found in this community:
 Field Maple (Acer campestre)
 Hazel (Corylus avellana)
 Ash (Fraxinus excelsior)
 Dog's-mercury (Mercurialis perennis)
 Bramble (Rubus fruticosus agg.)
 Common Feather-moss (Eurhynchium praelongum)

The following rare species are also associated with the community:
 Narrow-leaved Bittercress (Cardamine impatiens)
 Mezereon (Daphne mezereum)
 Wood Fescue (Festuca altissima)
 Mountain Currant (Ribes alpinum)
 Oxlip (Primula elatior)
 Primula × digenea, the hybrid between Oxlip and Primrose (P. vulgaris)
 Large-leaved Lime (Tilia platyphyllos)

Distribution

This community is widespread throughout lowland Britain, becoming scarcer in the north and west, where it is replaced by community W9.

Subcommunities

There are seven subcommunities:
 the Primula vulgaris - Glechoma hederacea subcommunity
 the Anemone nemorosa subcommunity
 the Deschampsia cespitosa subcommunity
 the Hedera helix subcommunity
 the Geranium robertianum subcommunity
 the Allium ursinum subcommunity
 the Teucrium scorodonia subcommunity

References

 Rodwell, J. S. (1991) British Plant Communities Volume 1 - Woodlands and scrub  (hardback),  (paperback)

W08